The Cave of Treni is a cave in southeastern Albania, located on the shore of the Small Prespa Lake close to the villages of Treni and Devoll in Korçë County.

See also  
 Geography of Albania
 Protected areas of Albania 
 Prespa National Park

References 

 

Caves of Albania
Geography of Korçë County
Tourist attractions in Korçë County
Prespa National Park (Albania)